Camille Carrión is a Puerto Rican actress and businesswoman.

Ms. Carrión resides in Puerto Rico where she is also a certified Chopra Center instructor, mainly teaching courses in Primordial Sound Meditation, Perfect Health and yoga.

Early life
Camille Carrión was born on October 12,1912 raised in San Juan, Puerto Rico. She formally began her artistic career as a teenager, together with Raúl Juliá, Lotti Cordero, Johanna Rosaly, José Gilberto Molinari, Roy Brown and Paul Stevens, among others. She joined the theatrical group Teatro Musical, directed by Robert Cox. During this initial stage of her career, she participated in various productions that were presented at the Tapia Theater in Old San Juan, Puerto Rico, most of them, well known Broadway Musicals: “Bye, Bye, Birdie”, by  Adams & Strouse (1962); “Fiorello”, by Jerry Bock & Sheldon Harnick (1967); “Little Mary Sunshine”, by Rick Besoyan (1965); “Time Remembered”, by Jean Anouilh (1967), among others.

After her high school graduation, from Saint John's School, in Puerto Rico, she entered the Boston Conservatory of Music, Drama & Dance, to study Musical Theatre. She remained there for only two years because when she returned to Puerto Rico for her Summer vacation after her sophomore year, producers Manuel «Maíto» Fernández Cortines and Paul Stevens offered her the role of “Maria” in “The Sound of Music” by Rodgers and Hammerstein, directed by Pablo Cabrera at the Tapia Theater from September 7 to October 2 in 1966. The musical was such a huge success and lasted so long that she was unable to return to Boston.

International Fame
Meanwhile, news of her success as «Maria von Trapp» had reached Spain, and, after having starred in various successful “soap operas” in Puerto Rico, (“Cuando la rival es una hija”,with Ofelia D’Acosta and Axel Anderson and “Melodía Otoñal” with Esteban de Pablos onTelemundo / Chanel 2), she was recruited to star with Alfredo Mayo, María Jesús Aguirre, Elder Barber and Josefina de la Torre in the Spanish premiere of Sound of Music (called “Sonrisas y lágrimas” in Spain), which was presented at the Teatro de la Zarzuela, in Madrid, opening on September 25, 1968, and running for 6 months. During her stay in Spain she married Catalan photographer and director, Gabriel Suau.

Return to Puerto Rico, Television
Back in Puerto Rico, she returned to television where she starred in telenovelas on all of the local stations. On WAPA TV / Chanel 4 she starred in the successful “Gabriela y Belinda”, on WRIK TV / Chanel 7, “Una vida para amarte” (1970), and together with Rolando Barral and Pilar Arenas on Telemundo / Chanel 2, “Una sombra entre los dos”. She was then re-hired by WAPA TV to star with Daniel Lugo in “María del Mar”, produced by Tommy Muñiz.

While continuing with her acting career, after the birth of her daughter Paloma (Born June 9, 1972 in San Juan, Puerto Rico and now a well known and respected film director and producer)) she entered the University of Puerto Rico where she completed her BA in Humanities with honors. In 1974 she was hired by KLRN TV, en San Antonio, Texas to play the role of Miss Hernández in the educational children's series “Carrascolendas”, which was aired on PBS. In 1978, she completed her master's degree in Hispanic Literature with honors, at New York University's campus in Madrid, Spain.
Back in Puerto Rico, she went back to television where she participated in “La jibarita”, with Alba Nydia Díaz and Jean Carlo Simancas on Chanel 11 (1970). This was followed by “El amor nuestro de cada día” with Johanna Rosaly and Jean Carlo Simancas, on WAPA TV (1980); “Viernes social” (1981); “María Eugenia” (1981-1982) y “Modelos, S.A.” (1982),these last three on Telemundo, Chanel 2. Her next soap opera was to be the most successful of her career: the leading role in “Vivir Para Ti”, with famous Argentinean leading man, Pablo Alarcón and with Ulises Brenes in the role of “el general Murillo”. (WAPA TV1982-1983).

In 1985, Camille Carrión joined actress Ángela Meyer to create Producciones MECA, a theatrical production company. Some of their most acclaimed theatrical productions were“Casa de mujeres”, “Death on the Nile” by Agatha Christie and “The Women” by Clare Booth Luce. After that, they formed Empresas MECA, to produce television. On Chanel 11,WLII TV they produced one of the most famous “noon shows” on the island: “Ellas al mediodía”, with Gladys Rodríguez, Marilyn Pupo, Elia Enid Cadilla, Sharon Riley, Claribel Medína and Carrión. They also produced various short soap operas that were inserted in the programs.

After leaving Empresas MECA, in 1988 she established Latino Television International, to produce Latino Video Billboard and after that, she returned to Chanel 11 to produce another noon show: “Ahora” with Marilyn Pupo, Gladys Rodríguez and Carrión herself as hosts. She then produced “En familia” on Chanel 6, WIPR TV with hosts Axel Anderson, Giselle Blondet, Carrión and Gilberto Valenzuela, and “Somos únicos”, for children, with Giselle as her co-host (1991-1992).

Radio career
Carrión became one of the best known radio personalities in Puerto Rico when she began hosting the morning show “Hello”, on station WIAC / Sistema 102 FM (Monday through Friday from 5:30 to 9:00 AM) with Héctor Marcano and Jesse Calderón. From there she went on to host the still “number 1” afternoon show “Happy Hour” on WFID 95.7 FM / Radio Fidelity (http://www.fidelitypr.com) aired Monday through Friday from 4:00 a 7:00.

Meditation Teacher
In 2004 she began her studies in Primordial Sound Meditation, after taking a course with Dr. Deepak Chopra. Meditation had such a positive influence in her life that she decided to delve deeper and in March 2007 she became a certified Chopra Center instructor in Primordial Sound Meditation. Ms. Carrión now resides between Puerto Rico and Cordes-sur-Ciel in France, and is teaching courses in Primordial Sound Meditation, Perfect Health (Ayurvedic lifestyle) and The 7 Spiritual Laws of Yoga.

See also

Richard Carrión
Paloma Suau
List of Puerto Ricans

References

Living people
Actresses from San Juan, Puerto Rico
Puerto Rican film actresses
Puerto Rican soap opera actresses
Puerto Rican television actresses
20th-century Puerto Rican actresses
Year of birth missing (living people)